may refer to:

People 
Takada (surname)

Places
Takada, Tokyo an area in Toshima, Tokyo.
Takada, Niigata former name of Joetsu, Niigata.
Bungo Takada, Ōita
Yamato Takada, Nara.

Organizations 
Takada is a branch of the Jodo Shinshu Buddhist tradition

See also 
 Takata Station (disambiguation)
 Takata (disambiguation)
 Takeda (disambiguation)